Magic Fire is a 1955 American biographical film about the life of composer Richard Wagner, released by Republic Pictures.

Directed by William Dieterle, the film made extensive use of Wagner's music, which was arranged by Erich Wolfgang Korngold.  Dieterle worked with Korngold on several Warner Bros. films, including A Midsummer Night's Dream and Juarez.  It was one of the final films Republic made in the two-strip color process known as Trucolor.

Although many details about Wagner's life were accurately portrayed, the film often distorted some facts, apparently for dramatic purposes.  One high point was the accurate depiction of the riot at the Paris Opera House for the premiere of the revised version of Tannhäuser.  The film depicted King Ludwig II's patronage of Wagner, without going into much detail about the king's controversial personality.

The film used a very large cast, opulent sets, and lavish costumes.  Since Republic was known primarily for westerns and adventure serials, Magic Fire was one of the rare "prestige" films to be produced by studio chief Herbert Yates.  Nevertheless, critical response was mixed and box office receipts in the U.S. were disappointing.

Plot
Conductor Richard Wagner dreams of being a composer. He falls for actress Minna Planer.

Cast
Alan Badel ...  Richard Wagner
Yvonne De Carlo ...  Minna Planer
Carlos Thompson ...  Franz Liszt
Rita Gam ... Cosima Liszt
Valentina Cortese ...  Mathilde Wesendonck
Peter Cushing ...  Otto Wesendonck
Frederick Valk ...  Minister von Moll
Gerhard Riedmann ...  King Ludwig II
Erik Schumann ...  Hans von Bülow
Robert Freitag ...  August Roeckel
Heinz Klingenberg ...  King of Saxonia
Charles Régnier ...  Giacomo Meyerbeer
Kurt Großkurth ...  Magdeburg Theatre Manager (as Kurt Grosskurth)
Fritz Rasp ...  Pfistermeister
Hans Quest ...  Robert Hubner
Jan Hendriks ...  Mikhail Bakunin
Erich Wolfgang Korngold ...  Hans Richter (uncredited)

Production
The film was based on a book by Bertita Harding published in 1953. It was described as "not strictly biography but not quite fiction.' Harding had written a number of other books in this genre.

Film rights were purchased in 1953 by William Dieterle, who had been interested in a film about Wagner for ten years. Dieterle had directed the film Juarez (1939) based in part on Harding's book The Phantom Crown. Dieterle wrote the script with David Chandler. Harding also worked on the script. Finance was obtained from Republic Pictures. Republic were expanding their production facilities at the time.

Howard Duff and Ida Lupino were originally considered for the leads. Charlton Heston was also discussed. Eventually the lead role went to Alan Badel who had just been in Dieterle's Salome (1953). Support parts went to Carlos Thompson, Rita Gam and Yvonne de Carlo. Thompson was borrowed from MGM.

Filming started in September 1954. The film was shot in Italy and Germany over 12 weeks and wound up in December.

De Carlo had discovered Carlos Thompson in Argentina and had him cast in Fort Algiers. The two had an affair and Thompson owed de Carlo money. Their relationship was over by the time they made this film though.

Reception
Dieterle wanted to make a film about Mozart but it did not happen.

Footnotes

See also
List of American films of 1955

External links

Magic Fire at TCMDB

1955 films
1950s historical drama films
American historical drama films
Films directed by William Dieterle
Cultural depictions of Richard Wagner
Cultural depictions of Ludwig II of Bavaria
Films about classical music and musicians
Films about composers
Films scored by Erich Wolfgang Korngold
Republic Pictures films
Films set in France
Films set in Germany
Films set in Italy
Films set in Switzerland
Films set in the 19th century
Trucolor films
Biographical films about musicians
1950s English-language films
1950s American films